The 2007–08 Columbus Blue Jackets season began October 5, 2007. It was the Blue Jackets' eighth season in the National Hockey League (NHL).

Key dates prior to the start of the season:

The 2007 NHL Entry Draft took place in Columbus, Ohio, on June 22–23
The free agency period began on July 1.
The Blue Jackets played 8 preseason games starting September 16.

The Blue Jackets attempted to qualify for the playoffs for the first time in franchise history. Scott Howson was hired prior to the 2007 NHL Entry Draft as the second general manager in team history, replacing Doug MacLean. The Blue Jackets finished with a 34–36–12 record, earning 80 points and missing the playoffs. The Blue Jackets finished fourth in the Central Division, finishing above the St. Louis Blues and 13th in the Western Conference. On March 16, 2008, Columbus set a franchise record for points in a season, 75, with a 4–3 win over the Detroit Red Wings in Columbus.

The Blue Jackets started off the season well with a 7–3–1 record in October, but falling behind in the Western Conference in November with a 4–7–3 record. During the All-star break, Rick Nash was selected to participate in the 2008 All-Star Game for the Western Conference. He scored a record-breaking goal just 12 seconds into the period. Nash scored three goals in the game, yet the Eastern Conference won the game 8–7. The Blue Jackets earned average records in December through February, staying within reach of a playoff spot. On February 26, Captain Adam Foote was traded to the Colorado Avalanche in exchange for two draft picks. Rick Nash was named the new captain of the team. In March, the Blue Jackets' chances of playing in the post-season were fading away after a 4–6–3 record due to the injury of starting goaltender Pascal Leclaire. After being mathematically eliminated from making the playoffs, the Blue Jackets lost their last three games of the season.

Regular season

Divisional standings

Conference standings

Schedule and results

October

Record: 7–3–1; Home: 4–1–1; Road: 3–2–0

November

Record: 4–7–3; Home: 3–2–1; Road: 1–5–2

December

Record: 7–5–2; Home: 6–3–2; Road: 1–2–0

January

Record: 7–7–0; Home: 3–1–0; Road: 4–6–0

February

Record: 5–5–3; Home: 0–3–2; Road: 5–2–1

March

Record: 4–6–3; Home: 4–3–1; Road: 0–3–2

April

Record: 0–3–0; Home: 0–1–0; Road 0–2–0

Green background indicates win.
Red background indicates regulation loss.
White background indicates overtime/shootout loss.

Playoffs
The Blue Jackets did not qualify for the 2007–08 playoffs and remained the only NHL team to never have qualified for the playoffs.

Player statistics

Regular season
Scoring

Goaltending

Note: GP = Games played; G = Goals; A = Assists; Pts = Points; +/- = Plus/minus; PIM = Penalty minutes; PPG=Power-play goals; SHG=Short-handed goals; GWG=Game-winning goals
      MIN=Minutes played; W = Wins; L = Losses; T/OT = Ties/Overtime Losses; GA = Goals against; GAA = Goals against average; SO = Shutouts; SA=Shots against; SV=Shots saved; SV% = Save percentage;

Awards and records

Records

Milestones

Transactions
The Blue Jackets have been involved in the following transactions during the 2007–08 season.

Trades

Free agents

Draft picks
Columbus' picks at the 2007 NHL Entry Draft in Columbus, Ohio.  The Blue Jackets picked 7th overall in front of their hometown crowd.

Farm teams

American Hockey League
Syracuse Crunch

ECHL
Elmira Jackals - It was announced on October 4 that the Elmira Jackals will take over as the ECHL affiliate to the Blue Jackets, replacing the Dayton Bombers.

See also
2007–08 NHL season

References

External links

Player stats: Columbus Blue Jackets player stats on espn.com
Game log: Columbus Blue Jackets game log on espn.com
Team standings: NHL standings on espn.com

External links
The Columbus Blue Jackets official website

Columbus Blue Jackets seasons
Columbus
Colum
Blue
Blue